The Warner Aircraft Corporation of Detroit, Michigan was the manufacturer of the Scarab family of radial engines for airplanes in 1928 through the early 1930s.

History
The original name of the company was Aeronautical Industries Incorporated. In October 1927 the company changed its name to the Warner Aircraft Corporation. In November 1927 the first Scarab radial engine was produced. The Scarab Junior was introduced in 1930. In 1933, the company designed and built a much larger radial engine, the Super Scarab. This was to be the last engine the company produced. Warner Aircraft was taken over by the Clinton Machine Company in 1950.

Engines

References

Manufacturing companies based in Detroit
Defunct aircraft engine manufacturers of the United States
Defunct manufacturing companies based in Michigan